Express Non-Stop is the third studio album by Danish band Alphabeat. It was released on 24 September 2012 by Copenhagen Records. Unlike their two previous albums This is Alphabeat and The Spell, it was released solely in their native Denmark. Express Non-Stop reached number three on the Danish chart, though it spent only seven weeks, making it the band's least successful album to date. The first two singles from the album, "Vacation" and "Love Sea", were certified gold in Denmark.

Track listing
All tracks written and produced by Alphabeat.

Personnel
Credits adapted from the liner notes of Express Non-Stop.

Alphabeat
 Alphabeat – production, recording
 Anders Bønløkke – guitar
 Stine Bramsen – vocals
 Troels Møller – drums
 Rasmus Nagel – keyboards
 Anders Reinholdt – bass
 Anders SG – vocals

Additional personnel
 Thomas Brando – artwork
 Jan Eliasson – mastering
 Rasmus Weng Karlsen – photography
 Mads Nilsson – mixing
 Torben Ravn – product management

Charts

References

2012 albums
Alphabeat albums